The Boreal Shield Ecozone, as defined by the Commission for Environmental Cooperation (CEC), is the largest ecozone in Canada. Covering 1.8 million square kilometres it covers almost 20% of Canada's landmass, stretching from northern Saskatchewan to Newfoundland.

Geography

Landforms 
The retreat of the Laurentide Ice Sheet left a landscape of broadly rolling uplands and lowlands with precambrian granitic bedrock outcrops. Few clear drainage channels were left in the rocky sediments deposited by the glacier resulting in a deranged drainage pattern. The numerous wetlands and lakes formed give this ecozone a unique character. Water features in this ecozone contain 22% of Canada's freshwater surface area.

Soils 
Soil types vary widely across the region in response to the wide range of climate and soil components present. Cryosols are found in the most northerly areas wherever there is permafrost. Accumulation of organic matter, particularly peat, results in organic soils in much of the area. Brunisols occur in the north and west of the region where coarse to medium sediments are found. In these soils, soil formation is ongoing and will eventually result in either podzols or luvisols. In the south and east, podzols are found under forests growing primarily on sand in cold conditions. Gleysols are found where poor drainage has resulted in depleted oxygen. Luvisols are present where forests overlay clay deposits. These two soil types occur across the region wherever these conditions occur.

Ecoprovinces
This ecozone can be further subdivided into six ecoprovinces:
Eastern Boreal Shield
Lake of the Woods
Mid-Boreal Shield
Newfoundland
Southern Boreal Shield
Western Boreal Shield

Ecoregions
Each province continues to work on defining subregions within the larger
national ecozone and ecoprovince system.

The Alberta Natural Subregion - Natural Regions (2006) found within this ecozone are:
 Tazin River Upland - Taiga Shield

The Manitoba Ecoregions within this ecozone are:
 Churchill River Upland Ecoregion  
 Hayes River Upland Ecoregion  
 Lac Seul Upland Ecoregion 
 Lake of the Woods Ecoregion

The Saskatchewan Ecoregions within this ecozone are:
 Churchill River Upland Ecoregion  
 Athabasca Plain Ecoregion

Climate
The regional climate has long, cold winters and short summers, conditions which are moderated in coastal regions. Summers in the east are warmer than those in the west of the region. The mean annual temperature ranges from -4 °C in northern Saskatchewan to 5.5 °C in Newfoundland. Precipitation increases from west to east.

Ecology

Flora
The region is widely forested with white and black spruce, balsam fir and jack pine. Deciduous trees are more common in the south, with white birch, trembling aspen and balsam poplar. There are also yellow birch and sugar maple to the east. In areas of muskeg there are stands of black spruce or tamarack. There are frequent forest fires.

Fauna
Being largely wild and remote, this ecozone is rich in wildlife, including woodland caribou, moose, wolf, black bear, raccoon, marten, fisher, striped skunk, lynx, bobcat and eastern chipmunk. Common birds include Boreal owl, great horned owl, blue jay, white- sparrow and evening grosbeak. Lakes contain brook char, lake trout, northern pike, perch, and walleye.

Off the northern and eastern coasts, aquatic mammals include grey seal, harp seal, hooded seal, ringed seal, sperm whale, orca, Atlantic pilot whale, fin whale, blue whale, northern right whale, bowhead whale, and humpback whale.

Climate change
Fire suppression, insect control, clear-cutting and single-species tree farming are widespread in accessible areas. These practices may, over the long term, reduce the diversity of both plant and animal species and increase the forest's vulnerability to disease.

Many Shield lakes and soils are extremely sensitive to changes in pH. Acid rain from local sources and from the long-range transport of airborne pollutants has already taken an ominous toll. It may be weakening the general vigour and growth rate of trees, as well as of aquatic species, in sensitive areas.

Conservation
Under 3% of the ecozone's total land space forbids industrial activities of any kind; this land space is therefore designated as protected. Another 5% of the ecozone's land space is also considered protected, though not as strictly; activities such as mining or forestry may be tolerable in such areas. The Boreal Shield is the largest ecozone in Canada, however, compared to other ecozones, it exhibits among the smallest shares of land that have been deemed protected. Because the region is abundant in forest land, it is subject to extensive forestry practices.

In order to strengthen public dialogue and engagement on matters concerned with protected areas within the ecozone, land allocation programs have been adopted in Ontario and Saskatchewan. The programs consist of local and regional-level advisory groups that serve to help select and manage conservation areas in these provinces.

Protected areas
A number of protected areas have been established to protect representative and/or significant portions of this ecozone. These include Georgian Bay Islands National Park, Gros Morne National Park, La Mauricie National Park, Mealy Mountains National Park Reserve, Mingan Archipelago National Park Reserve, Pukaskwa National Park, and Terra Nova National Park.

References

External links
Boreal Shield (The Canadian Atlas)

Ecozones of Canada
Ecozones and ecoregions of Alberta
Ecozones and ecoregions of Manitoba
Ecozones and ecoregions of Newfoundland and Labrador
Ecozones and ecoregions of Ontario
Ecozones and ecoregions of Quebec
Ecozones and ecoregions of Saskatchewan